The Warren Hickox House, also known as the Hickox/Brown house, is a 1900 Frank Lloyd Wright house in the Prairie School style in Kankakee, Illinois, United States. The house design is similar to two articles Wright published in the Ladies' Home Journal.

History
Warren Hickox, Jr. ran a real estate and loan business in Kankakee, Illinois. Warren was the brother of Anna Hickox Bradley, who lived next door in another Wright design, the B. Harley Bradley House. The house was modeled after two articles that Wright wrote for the Ladies' Home Journal. The interior is adapted from "A Home in a Prairie Town" and the exterior is based on "A Small House with Lots of Room in It". These designs themselves may have been based on "Primitive Chinese House", an article in Histoire de l'Habitation Humaine, depuis les Temps Préhistoriques Jusqu'à nos Jours by Eugène Viollet-le-Duc. The builder may have used the Hickox House as a temporary headquarters while the Bradley House was still under construction.

Architecture
The exterior walls are covered in white plaster, decorated with stained woodwork. Interior walls are also plaster with a sand finish. Interior woodwork, except oak floors, is Georgia pine and is suggestive of Tudor half-timber framing. The F.B. Henderson House in Elmhurst, Illinois is a mirror-image of the building. The house also has a very similar design to the S. A. Foster House in Chicago. The house has four bedrooms and a chimney. The house retains much of its original integrity except for the removal of the kitchen entrance and south terrace. The house is considered a "mature" example of Wright's Prairie school designs and has been called "one of the single most significant houses" designed by Wright. The house was added to the National Register of Historic Places on January 3, 1978. On August 22, 1986, the house was also listed as part of the Riverview Historic District.

References 

 Storrer, William Allin. The Frank Lloyd Wright Companion. University Of Chicago Press, 2006,  (S.056)

External links 

Hickox House on appraisercitywide.com
Hickox House on dgunning.org

Frank Lloyd Wright buildings
Houses in Kankakee County, Illinois
Historic district contributing properties in Illinois
National Register of Historic Places in Kankakee County, Illinois
Houses on the National Register of Historic Places in Illinois